Alain Robert (born as Robert Alain Philippe on 7 August 1962) is a French rock climber and urban climber. Known as "the French Spider-Man" (after the comic character Spider-Man) or "the Human Spider", Robert is famous for his free solo climbing, scaling skyscrapers using no climbing equipment except for a small bag of chalk and a pair of climbing shoes.

Strategy
Because authorities do not normally give him permission for such dangerous exploits, Robert will appear at dawn on the site of whichever giant skyscraper he has chosen to climb.  His exploits attract crowds of onlookers who stop to watch him climb. As a consequence, Robert has been arrested many times, in various countries, by law enforcement officials waiting for him at the end of his climb. In recent years, however, Robert has done his climbs with permission and sponsorship.

His rock-climbing physical training and technique allow him to climb using the small protrusions of building walls and windows (such as window ledges and frames). Many of his climbs provide him no opportunity to rest and can last several hours. He sometimes has a small bag of climbing chalk powder fastened around his waist.

Career

Robert has climbed landmarks including the Burj Khalifa, Eiffel Tower, the Sydney Opera House and the Montparnasse Tower as well as other of the world's tallest skyscrapers, most of them performed free-solo.

On 20 March 1997, he climbed the Petronas Twin Towers in Kuala Lumpur, Malaysia but was arrested at the 60th floor, 28 floors below the top.

In June 1999, Robert climbed the  Marriott Hotel in Warsaw.

On 20 August 1999, he climbed the Sears Tower, the second man to do so after Dan Goodwin. However, Robert performed the climb with no equipment other than a chalk bag and shoes, while Goodwin used suction cups and sky hooks, wearing a homemade Spider-Man suit.

On 21 February 2003, he legally climbed the  National Bank of Abu Dhabi, UAE, watched by about 100,000 spectators. It became more frequent for Robert to be paid to scale buildings as part of publicity efforts.

On 12 May 2003, he was paid approximately $18,000 to climb the  Lloyd's building to promote the premiere of the movie Spider-Man on the British television channel Sky Movies.

On 19 October 2004, he scaled the  headquarters of the French oil company Total while wearing a Spider-Man costume.

On 25 December 2004, Robert scaled Taipei 101 a few days before its grand opening as the tallest building in the world. The  climb was legal, part of the week's festivities. The skyscraper's outwardly slanting sides posed no apparent difficulty for him, but heavy rain resulted in a climb lasting four hours—double his estimate.

On 11 June 2005, he climbed the Cheung Kong Centre in Hong Kong, scaling  to reach the top of the 62-story tower.

On 1 September 2006, he climbed the tallest building in Lithuania and the Baltic States – Europa Tower, in Vilnius. Wearing a black suit and using a safety rope, which he detached several times, he reached the observation deck of the building, in 40 minutes.

In 2006 he also climbed Torre Vasco da Gama in Portugal as part of an advertisement for Optimus, a national mobile operator.

On 7 December 2006, he finished the year climbing the Santa Fe World Plaza in Mexico City.

On 23 February 2007, he legally climbed the headquarters building of Abu Dhabi Investment Authority (ADIA) on the coast of Abu Dhabi.

On 20 March 2007, he again climbed the Petronas Twin Towers, marking the tenth anniversary of his previous ascent of this building. Upon reaching the 60th floor, he allowed himself to be apprehended. He flew the Malaysian flag and drew applause from waiting police, fire crew and media representatives before handing himself in. He was handcuffed and escorted off the premises before being driven to a police station.

On 31 May 2007, he scaled the 88-story Jin Mao Building in Shanghai, China's then-tallest building, once again wearing a Spider-Man costume. He was subsequently arrested and jailed for five days before being expelled from China.

On 4 September 2007, he climbed the  Federation Tower office building in Moscow, (Russia's tallest skyscraper). He was detained by police afterwards.

On 18 November 2007, Robert climbed the  Tianmen mountain despite initially being banned from China for five years earlier in May, after being invited by the local government of Zhangjiajie, a scenic region in the southern province of Hunan, to boost the profile of the region and bring in tourists.

On 18 December 2007, he climbed the 29-story Portland House office building in London (Westminster's tallest building). It took him just over 40 minutes. Police taped off the area and later arrested him for criminal damage and wasting police time.

On 15 April 2008, he climbed the 60-story Four Seasons Place in Hong Kong. The police and four fire engines were standing by and it took him almost 1 hour to reach the top. He stated that his climb was intended to increase awareness of global warming.

On 5 June 2008, he climbed the New York Times Building in New York City. He unfurled a banner with a slogan about global warming and was then arrested by police on the roof. The banner read "Global warming kills more people than 9/11 every week". On the same day a second person, Renaldo Clarke, also climbed the Times Building.

On 17 February 2009, he once again climbed the Cheung Kong Centre in Hong Kong, taking 40 minutes to reach the top of the 62-story tower. He unfurled a banner reading "onehundredmonths.org" while climbing.

On 2 April 2009, during the 2009 G-20 London summit, he climbed to the 9th floor of the Lloyd's building and unfurled a 33-metre banner declaring that there were 100 months left to save the planet.

On 2 June 2009, he climbed to the 41st floor of the RBS Tower in Sydney, Australia before returning to the ground. He was arrested as he finished his descent.

On 1 September 2009, one day after Malaysia celebrated its 52nd Independence Day and after two arrests in 1997 and 2007, Alain Robert finally made it successfully to the top of the Petronas Twin Towers. He started at 6:00 am local time and reached the top at 7:40 am local time without attracting the attention of the public. He celebrated his climb by standing with his arms outspread on the pinnacle of one of the Twin Towers. He was later fined RM2000 in default of two months jail at the Kuala Lumpur magistrate's court after he pleaded guilty to criminal trespass for scaling the Petronas Twin Towers.

On 28 March 2011, Robert climbed the tallest building in the world, the 828-meter Burj Khalifa tower in Dubai, taking just over six hours to complete the climb. However, he used a harness in accordance with safety procedure.

On 4 September 2011, he legally climbed the 240-meter tall central tower of Moscow State University, during a 2-hour 4D show by David Atkins, in which the university was used as a projection screen.

On 14 October 2011, he climbed the InterContinental Bucharest in Romania.

On 12 April 2012, he set a Guinness World Record for climbing the 300m-high Aspire Tower in Doha, Qatar in the fastest time (1 hour, 33 minutes and 47 seconds).

On 21 June 2012, he legally climbed the 110-metre high Mauritius Telecom Tower in Mauritius as part of an advertising campaign for the launching of 4G cellular technology by the telecommunications operator. He was aided by safety ropes, harnesses and suction cups.

In November 2012, Robert was spotted inside The Shard in London. The building's owners subsequently obtained an injunction preventing Robert from ever returning.

On 27 March 2014, he climbed the Tour Ariane outside Paris in 45 minutes. Onlookers and police gathered to watch his climb. He was arrested by police and later released without being charged.

On 12 April 2015, he climbed the Cayan Tower in Dubai, a 307-meter tall twisted building, in 70 minutes.

On 23 April 2016, he climbed the Esentai Tower in Almaty, Kazakhstan. The Esentai Tower is the second highest building in Kazakhstan; it is 162 meters tall and is used as the Ritz Carlton Hotel and for offices.

On 25 November 2017, he climbed the Torre Agbar, a 38-storey skyscraper in Barcelona, Spain.

On 25 October 2018, he climbed the Heron Tower, a 46-storey skyscraper in London.

On 29 January 2019, he climbed the G.T. International Tower, a 181-meter tall skyscraper in Manila. He was arrested upon finishing his descent.

On 16 August 2019, he once again climbed the Cheung Kong Centre in Hong Kong. He hung a banner with the Hong Kong and China flags above a handshake near the top of the building.

On 28 September 2019, he climbed the Skyper building, a 153-meter tall skyscraper in Frankfurt. He was arrested upon finishing his descent.

On 1 October 2020, he climbed the 166m tall Silberturm (Silver Tower) in Frankfurt.

On 23 November 2021, he once again climbed the Skyper building in Frankfurt, before being arrested by German authorities.

On 17 September 2022, he once again climbed the Tour Total in Paris, to celebrate his 60th birthday which is the French retirement age. He wanted to prove that "being 60 is nothing. You can still do sport, be active, do fabulous things."

Notable climbs
The table below contains the notable structures climbed by Alain Robert.

Accidents

In a 2005 interview, Robert said that he has fallen seven times in his life. The worst was his fall in September 1982.

On 18 January 1982, at 19, he fell  when his anchor and rope gave way during training. He fractured his wrists, heels and nose and underwent three operations.

On 29 September 1982, at 20, he fell  when his rope came undone while abseiling. He was in a coma for five days and fractured both forearms, his elbow, pelvis and nose. His elbow was also dislocated and a nerve was damaged, leaving him partially paralyzed. He also suffered cerebral edema and vertigo. He underwent six operations on his hands and elbow.

In 1993, he fell  while showing students how to rely on their legs when climbing. He kept his hands behind his back on an easy route but lost his balance and fell headfirst, shattering both wrists. He went into another coma and spent two months in the hospital.

In 2004, he fell 2 metres (~6 ft) when climbing a traffic light whilst posing for a photo in an interview. He landed on his elbow and needed forty stitches; just one month later he climbed the world's tallest skyscraper at the time, Taipei 101, as part of its official opening week.

Books and documentaries 
Robert's autobiography, With Bare Hands, was first published in English in 2008. It features his development into a famous urban climber from his days as a child and gives a deep insight into his philosophy and how he managed to overcome his disabilities.

The book was released for the Asian market in April by Blacksmith Books in Hong Kong with the subtitle "The true story of Alain Robert, the real-life Spiderman". In September it was released by Maverick House Publishers in the UK for the English language market across Europe. This edition has the subtitle "The Story of the Human Spider".

There is a 52-minute documentary about Robert titled The Wall Crawler by Director/Producer Julie Cohen, released in 1998.

The Channel 4 series Cutting Edge covered Robert in an episode entitled The Human Spider in April 2008.

Awards
 Faust Challenger of the Year (2011), Japan

See also
Harry Gardiner
Dan Goodwin
Ivan Kristoff
Philippe Petit
Owen Quinn
George Willig

References

External links
 Official Website – includes a number of photos
 Audio interview with Alain Robert by amateur podcasters Happy Trail Mix

1962 births
Living people
People from Saône-et-Loire
French rock climbers
Urban climbers
Free soloists
French environmentalists
French stunt performers
Sportspeople from Saône-et-Loire